Marco Balestri (born 8 November 1953 in Perugia) is an Italian author and radio talk show host. He has hosted shows like Per la strada, "Bubusette", Scherzi a parte.

References

1953 births
Living people
People from Perugia